Donald McIntyre ( - January 1866) was an Australian politician, who was a member of the New South Wales Legislative Council from 1848 to 1851.

Early life
McIntrye's brother Peter established a property Blairmore, on the land of the Wanaruah people, near what is now Aberdeen. Donald emigrated to New South Wales and in 1827 established a property nearby, Kayuga. In 1834 he established another station Dalkeith at what is now Cassilis, on the land of the Wiradjuri people.

In November 1833 a shepherd that McIntyre employed, variously referred to as Edward Hills, Edward Giles or William Gills, hit him in the back of the head with a piece of iron. The shepherd was convicted of attempted murder, sentenced to death, and was hanged in March 1834.

Legislative Council
In 1843 McIntyre stood as a candidate for the Counties of Hunter, Brisbane and Bligh, but was unsuccessful. He stood again in 1848, winning the election. He did not nominate for election in 1851.

Later life

On 19 December 1854 McIntyre married Margaret McGreggor.
He died on 2 January 1866 at Glebe, aged 76.

See also
Members of the New South Wales Legislative Council, 1843–1851
Results of the 1843 and 1848 elections

References

 

Year of birth missing
Year of death missing
Members of the New South Wales Legislative Council

Settlers of New South Wales